The Woolmer lecture is the flagship lecture of the Institute of Physics and Engineering in Medicine. It takes place annually during the Institute's Medical Physics and Engineering Conference.

Dedication 
The lecture is dedicated to Professor Ronald Woolmer (1908–1962) who was the first Director of the Research Department of Anaesthetics at the Royal College of Surgeons. Woolmer convened a meeting at the Royal College of Surgeons, London, to discuss the evolving field of engineering applied to medicine. It was agreed that the group should hold regular meetings and as a result the Biological Engineering Society (BES) was formed with Ronald Woolmer as the first President. Woolmer died two years after the formation of the BES and it was agreed that a memorial lecture would be sponsored in recognition of his achievements.

Lecturers

See also
 List of medicine awards

References 

British lecture series
British science and technology awards
Medicine awards